Sterile alpha motif domain containing 4A is a protein that in humans is encoded by the SAMD4A gene.

Function

Sterile alpha motifs (SAMs) in proteins such as SAMD4A are part of an RNA-binding domain that functions as a posttranscriptional regulator by binding to an RNA sequence motif known as the Smaug recognition element, which was named after the Drosophila Smaug protein (Baez and Boccaccio, 2005 [PubMed 16221671]).[supplied by OMIM, Mar 2008].

References

Further reading